Sefton Samuels (born 1931 in Manchester) is a British photographer known for his photojournalistic portrayal of northern England. He was described by painter LS Lowry as his favourite photographer. His style has been compared to that of photographer Bill Brandt.

Shot over five decades, his pictures include images of George Best, LS Lowry, Coronation Street, Louis Armstrong and the changing culture and landscape of northern England. Around one hundred of Samuels’ photographs are held in the National Portrait Gallery and Victoria and Albert Museum. He has also held exhibitions at the Barbican Centre, Kings Place and Proud Galleries.

Life and work 
Samuels worked in the mills of Lancashire and Yorkshire and as a professional jazz drummer before turning to photography.

His photograph of George Best was used on the cover of Paul Weller’s Stanley Road album designed by artist Peter Blake. Samuels’ intimate images of LS Lowry at home were used as the basis for a life-size statue of the painter erected in a Manchester bar.

In 2011, Random House published a major collection of Samuels' work documenting the north of England over five decades, entitled Northerners: Portrait of a no-nonsense people. He was interviewed about Northerners by his son, BBC documentary maker and broadcaster Tim Samuels, on The Culture Show on BBC Two. Samuels was a winner at the 2011 Royal Academy of Arts Eyewitness awards—inspired by Brassaï and Robert Capa—for street photography he took in Madeira.

Exhibition (with others) 
1963: Nine Photographers, Manchester Building and Design Centre, Manchester, 18 November – 6 December 1963. With Shirley Baker, Dennis Btesh, Ray Green, Alfred Gregory, Neil Libbert and Ralph Marshall.

References

External links 
 

Photographers from Manchester
1931 births
Living people